The Greig-Duncan Folk Song Collection from northeast Scotland, was the work of the schoolmaster and musician, Gavin Greig (1856–1914), and the minister James Bruce Duncan (1848-1917). The project began in 1902 and was completed between then and the First World War. A selection of the songs was published in 1925 under the title Last Leaves of Traditional Ballads and Ballad Airs collected in Aberdeenshire by the Late Gavin Greig.

Greig and Duncan were originally criticised for including 'impure' versions of the songs, following uncritically the taste and sources of those providing the songs. Some verses were also thought indecent. This resulted in many songs being excluded from the 1925 edition and not being published until the 1980s. However Greig and Duncan's method of collecting without editing is now recognized for its soundness.

The collection as a whole was edited by Pat Shuldham-Shaw (and then Emily Lyle) following the rediscovery of Duncan's notebooks in the 1960s. As published in 1981-2002, it includes 1,933 songs in eight volumes arranged according to themes: nautical, military, historical songs, narrative songs, songs of the countryside, home, and social life, songs of courtship, songs of love, songs of parting, children's songs and rhymes. A separate selection of 150 songs was published for singers in 2009 by Dr. Katherine Campbell, concentrating on 28 singers who originally contributed to the collection.

Bibliography
Campbell, Katherine (2009): Songs from North East Scotland: A Selection for Performers from the Greig-Duncan Folk Song Collection John Donald Publishers Ltd.
Shuldham-Shaw, P. (1973), The Greig-Duncan Folk Song Manuscripts, in Maisels, C.K. (ed.), Folk Song and the Folk Tradition, Festival issue of the New Edinburgh Review, August 73, pp. 3 - 5
Shuldham-Shaw, P. and Lyle, E.B. (eds.) (1981-2002), The Greig-Duncan Folk Song Collection, vols. 1-8, Aberdeen University Press, Aberdeen  etc.

References
Notes

Sources
James Bruce Duncan: folksong collection papers at Aberdeen University, accessed 28 December 2011
Olson I A, 'The Greig-Duncan Folk Song Collection' in Review of Scottish Culture. No. 5. 1989, Edinburgh
Olson I A's review on Mustrad (2003), accessed 28 December 2011
Porter, Jame (2000): Review of Volume 5 in Western Folklore, Winter, 2000
Purser, John's review of Volume 8 on Mustrad (2003), accessed 28 December 2011

See also
Bothy ballad

External links
Songs from North-East Scotland: A Selection for Performers from The Greig-Duncan Folk Song Collection (University of Edinburgh), accessed 28 December 2011
Edinburgh University  School of Literatures, Languages & Cultures link to performances of songs from the Greig-Duncan Collection, accessed 27 July 2015

Scottish folk music